École secondaire Toronto Ouest is a public French-language high school in Toronto, Ontario, Canada.
The school is operated by the Conseil scolaire Viamonde. It occupies part of the former West Toronto Collegiate building, which it shares with École secondaire catholique Saint-Frère-André, a French-language Roman Catholic high school operated by the Conseil scolaire catholique MonAvenir.

References

External links
 École secondaire Toronto Ouest

High schools in Toronto
Educational institutions established in 2012
2012 establishments in Ontario
French-language high schools in Ontario